John James Taylor (2 February 1907 – 5 May 1987) was an Australian rules footballer who played with St Kilda in the Victorian Football League (VFL).

Notes

External links 

1907 births
1987 deaths
Australian rules footballers from Victoria (Australia)
St Kilda Football Club players